is a Japanese footballer who playing as a midfielder and currently play for FC Imabari.

Career statistics

Club
.

Notes

References

External links
Profile at FC Imabari

1999 births
Living people
Japanese footballers
Association football midfielders
Niigata University of Health and Welfare alumni
J3 League players
Kashiwa Reysol players
Kataller Toyama players
FC Imabari players